Rahe may refer to:

People
 Friedrich Wilhelm Rahe (1888–1949), German tennis and field hockey player
 Paul A. Rahe (born 1948), American historian, writer and professor of history
 Randy Rahe (born 1960), American college basketball coach

Places
 Rahe (crater), a Martian crater
 Rahe, Jharkhand, a village in Ranchi district, Jharkhand, India
 Rahe block, an administrative sub-district in Ranchi district, Jharkhand, India